Richard Yates (born 26 January 1986) is an English track and field athlete who specialised in the 400 metres hurdles. His most prominent performance was a 5th-place finish and a 4 × 400 metres relay bronze medal at the 2010 Commonwealth Games. His personal best for the 400m hurdles is 49.06 seconds.

Richard started running in his early childhood at the age of four and continued to pursue athletics alongside his education, first competing at an international level by the time he was 22. Despite becoming the British Champion at 400m hurdles in 2008 he was not selected to represent Great Britain in the Beijing Olympics, to some controversy. He later reclaimed his title as English Champion again in 2013 and also in 2016.

Outside of his achievements on the athletics track, he studied law at the University of Leeds, achieving upper second class honours (2:1), and qualified as a solicitor specialising in Sports Law and Commercial Disputes at Manchester law firm JMW Solicitors LLP. He continued to pursue his legal career at the same time as competitive athletics, including seventh place in the 400 m hurdles at the 2014 Commonwealth Games. His personal best stands at 49.06.

Achievements

See also
Combined track and field events
List of hurdlers
Men's 400 metres hurdles world record progression

References
 

Living people
1986 births
English male hurdlers
British male hurdlers
Commonwealth Games medallists in athletics
Commonwealth Games bronze medallists for England
Athletes (track and field) at the 2010 Commonwealth Games
Athletes (track and field) at the 2014 Commonwealth Games
British Athletics Championships winners
Medallists at the 2010 Commonwealth Games